The men's cycling sprint at the 2012 Olympic Games in London took place at the London Velopark from 4 to 6 August. There were 17 competitors from 17 nations, with nations once again limited to one cyclist each (the limit had fluctuated between one and two since 1928). The event was won by Jason Kenny of Great Britain, the nation's second consecutive victory in the men's sprint. Kenny was the eighth man to win multiple medals in the event. Kenny beat Grégory Baugé of France in the final. Australia's Shane Perkins took bronze.

Background

This was the 25th appearance of the event, which has been held at every Summer Olympics except 1904 and 1912. Two of the quarterfinalists from 2008 returned: silver medalist Jason Kenny of Great Britain	and eighth-place finisher Azizulhasni Awang of Malaysia. The favorite was Grégory Baugé of France, the four-time world champion (2009–2012). The British team, which had both of the finalists at the 2008 Beijing Games (Kenny and champion Chris Hoy), had to choose one because of the rule change that limited nations to one cyclist; Kenny, who had taken silver in the 2011 and 2012 world championships, was selected over Hoy, who had taken bronze in those years. (Baugé's 2011 title was later stripped due to missed doping tests, retroactively elevating Kenny and Hoy to world champion and runner-up). Kenny had never beaten Baugé head-to-head.

No nations made their debut in the men's sprint. France made its 25th appearance, the only nation to have competed at every appearance of the event.

Qualification

There were 18 quota places available for the men's sprint, with a maximum of one cyclist per nation. The 10 nations qualified for the team sprint event could each enter one member of the team in the individual sprint. The other eight places went to the top eight remaining nations on the 2010–12 UCI rankings not yet qualified.

Competition format

The event was a single-elimination tournament, with repechages after the first two rounds, after seeding via time trial. The time trial involved an 875-metre distance, but with only the last 200 metres timed. All other races were 750 metres (three laps of the track) with side-by-side starts, with time kept for the last 200 metres. The first two main rounds featured single head-to-head races, with winners advancing and losers competing in repechages. Repechage races were contested by up to 3 cyclists. Beginning with the quarterfinals, each match pitted two cyclists against each other in best-of-three races.

Records

The records for the sprint are 200 metre flying time trial records, kept for the qualifying round in later Games as well as for the finish of races.

Jason Kenny set a new Olympic record of 9.713 seconds in the qualifying round.

Schedule 

All times are (British Summer Time)

Results

Qualifying round

Round 1

Heat 1

Heat 2

Heat 3

Heat 4

Heat 5

Heat 6

Heat 7

Heat 8

First repechage

First repechage heat 1

First repechage heat 2

First repechage heat 3

1/8 finals

1/8 final 1

1/8 final 2

1/8 final 3

1/8 final 4

1/8 final 5

1/8 final 6

Second repechage

Second repechage heat 1

Second repechage heat 2

Quarterfinals

Quarterfinal 1

Quarterfinal 2

Quarterfinal 3

Quarterfinal 4

Semifinals

Semifinal 1

Semifinal 2

Finals

Classification 9—12

Classification 5—8

Bronze medal match

Gold medal match

Notes

The first round was meant to have 9 heats, with a total of 18 riders. However, due to a rider from the Netherlands withdrawing from the competition the first round had 17 riders with Jason Kenny receiving a bye and therefore automatically qualifying for the next round. Because there was 17 competitors rather than 18, Christos Volikakis, who qualified in 17th place thought that he did not qualify and the competition was switched to a 16 rider format, resulting in him leaving the competition. This was not the case, and therefore Grégory Baugé also qualified automatically. Despite qualifying automatically, both riders had to ride half a lap of the track to qualify.

Final classification

References

Track cycling at the 2012 Summer Olympics
Cycling at the Summer Olympics – Men's sprint
Men's events at the 2012 Summer Olympics